Pellaphalia Creek may refer to:

Pellaphalia Creek (Leake County, Mississippi)
Pellaphalia Creek (Leake and Madison counties, Mississippi)